Franz Rill (born 1 December 1987) is a German male professional boxer. He was the  IBF International Heavyweight champion in 2016. Franz challenged for the European title in 2015 but lost to Robert Helenius.

Professional boxing record

|style="text-align:center;" colspan="9"|18 fights, 16 wins (11 knockouts), 2 losses (1 knockouts)
|- style="text-align:center; background:#e3e3e3;"
|style="border-style:none none solid solid; "|
|style="border-style:none none solid solid; "|Result
|style="border-style:none none solid solid; "|Record
|style="border-style:none none solid solid; "|Opponent
|style="border-style:none none solid solid; "|Type
|style="border-style:none none solid solid; "|Round, time
|style="border-style:none none solid solid; "|Date
|style="border-style:none none solid solid; "|Location
|style="border-style:none none solid solid; "|Notes
|- align=center
|18
|Win
|16-2
|align=left| Luis Pascual
|UD
|8
|8 Sep 2018
|align=left|
|align=left|
|- align=center
|17
|Win
|15-2
|align=left| Sebastian Ignacio Ceballos
|TKO
|1 (8), 1:36
|17 Mar 2018
|align=left|
|align=left|
|- align=center
|16
|Win
|14-2
|align=left| Ricardo Humberto Ramirez
|KO
|2 (8), 0:57
|16 Dec 2017
|align=left|
|align=left|
|- align=center
|15
|Loss
|13-2
|align=left| Adrian Granat
|TKO
|6 (12), 1:30
|15 Oct 2016
|align=left|
|align=left|
|- align=center
|14
|Win
|13-1
|align=left| Salvatore Erittu
|KO
|4 (12), 0:56
|24 Jun 2016
|align=left|
|align=left|
|- align=center
|13
|Win
|12-1
|align=left| Marko Colic
|KO
|3 (8), 0:50
|06 Mar 2016
|align=left|
|align=left|
|- align=center
|12
|Loss
|11-1
|align=left| Robert Helenius
|UD
|12
|19 Dec 2015
|align=left|
|align=left|
|- align=center
|11
|Win
|11-0
|align=left| Branislav Plavsic
|TKO
|1 (8), 0:43
|6 Sep 2015
|align=left|
|align=left|
|- align=center
|10
|Win
|10-0
|align=left| Paul Butlin
|UD
|8
|17 Jul 2015
|align=left|
|align=left|
|- align=center
|9
|Win
|9-0
|align=left| Andras Csomor
|KO
|2 (8), 1:35
|2 May 2015
|align=left|
|align=left|
|- align=center
|8
|Win
|8-0
|align=left| Gabriel Enguema
|UD
|8
|14 Mar 2015
|align=left|
|align=left|
|- align=center
|7
|Win
|7-0
|align=left| Oleksiy Mazikin
|PTS
|8
|12 Dec 2014
|align=left|
|align=left|
|- align=center
|6
|Win
|6-0
|align=left| Istvan Ruzsinszky
|KO
|1 (6), 1:04
|8 Nov 2014
|align=left|
|align=left|
|- align=center
|5
|Win
|5-0
|align=left| Laszlo Toth
|TKO
|1 (8), 1:18
|21 Mar 2014
|align=left|
|align=left|
|- align=center
|4
|Win
|4-0
|align=left| Ivo Andelic
|TKO
|4 (6), 2:02
|16 Nov 2013
|align=left|
|align=left|
|- align=center
|3
|Win
|3-0
|align=left| Alban Galonnier
|KO
|2 (6), 0:47
|7 Sep 2013
|align=left|
|align=left|
|- align=center
|2
|Win
|2-0
|align=left| Lonja Fanta
|KO
|1 (6), 2:59
|29 Jun 2013
|align=left|
|align=left|
|- align=center
|1
|Win
|1-0
|align=left| Craig Hudson
|UD
|4
|15 Sep 2012
|align=left|
|align=left|
|- align=center

Boxing career

References

External links 
 

1987 births
Living people
German male boxers
Sportspeople from Oshawa
Heavyweight boxers